Russula lenkunya is a mushroom in the genus Russula. Found in South Australia, it was first described scientifically by mycologist Cheryl Grgurinovic in 1997.

See also
List of Russula species

References

External links

lenkunya
Fungi of Australia
Fungi described in 1997
Taxa named by Cheryl A. Grgurinovic